"I Might Need Security" is a song written by American rapper Chance the Rapper. It was released as a single on July 19, 2018, and was produced by Chance, Peter CottonTale and Smoko Ono.

Background and composition 
The song samples one part of the piano session from the television special Jamie Foxx: I Might Need Security. Chance the Rapper takes shots at his detractors, most notably Chicago mayor Rahm Emanuel. In the second verse, Chance criticizes how Chicago news outlets have been treating him, and reveals that he has purchased news website Chicagoist.

Charts

References 

2018 singles
2018 songs
Chance the Rapper songs
Songs written by Chance the Rapper